Jemaah Islamiyah (al-Jamāʿah al-Islāmiyyah, meaning "Islamic Congregation", frequently abbreviated JI) is a Southeast Asian Islamist militant group based in Indonesia,  which is dedicated to the establishment of an Islamic state in Southeast Asia. On 25 October 2002, immediately following the JI-perpetrated Bali bombing, JI was added to the UN Security Council Resolution 1267 as a terrorist group linked to Al-Qaeda or the Taliban.

JI is a transnational organization with cells in Indonesia, Singapore, Malaysia and the Philippines. In addition to al-Qaeda, the group is also thought to have alleged links to the Moro Islamic Liberation Front and Jamaah Ansharut Tauhid, a splinter cell of the JI which was formed by Abu Bakar Baasyir on 27 July 2008. The group has been designated as a terrorist group by the United Nations, Australia, Canada, China, Japan, the United Kingdom and the United States. It remained very active in Indonesia where it publicly maintained a website .

In October 2021, Director of Identification and Socialization, Detachment 88 Muhammad Sodiq said that 876 members of Jamaah Islamiyah had been arrested and sentenced in Indonesia.

On 16 November 2021, Indonesian National Police launched a crackdown operation, which revealed that the group operated in disguise as a political party, Indonesian People's Da'wah Party. The revelation shocked many people, as it was the first time in Indonesia that a terrorist organization disguised itself as a political party and attempted to intervene and participate in the Indonesian political system.

History

JI has its roots in Darul Islam (DI, meaning "House of Islam"), a radical Islamist/anti-colonialist movement in Indonesia in the 1940s.

The JI was established as a loose confederation of several Islamic groups. Sometime around 1969, three men, Abu Bakar Bashir, Abdullah Sungkar and Shahrul Nizam 'PD' began an operation to propagate the Darul Islam movement, a conservative strain of Islam.

Bashir and Sungkar were both imprisoned by the New Order administration of Indonesian president Suharto as part of a crackdown on radical groups such as Komando Jihad, that were perceived to undermine the government's control over the Indonesian population. The two leaders spent several years in prison.  After release, Bashir and his followers moved to Malaysia in 1982. They recruited people from Indonesia, Malaysia, Singapore, and the Philippines. The group officially named itself Jemaah Islamiah around that time period.

JI was formally founded on 1 January 1993, by JI leaders, Abu Bakar Bashir and Abdullah Sungkar while hiding in Malaysia from the persecution of the Suharto government. After the fall of the Suharto regime in 1998, both men returned to Indonesia where JI gained a terrorist edge when one of its founders, the late Abdullah Sungkar, established contact with Osama Bin Laden's al-Qaeda network.

JI's violent operations began during the communal conflicts in Maluku and Poso. It shifted its attention to targeting US and Western interests in Indonesia and the wider Southeast Asian region  since the start of the US-led war on terror. JI's terror plans in Southeast Asia were exposed when its plot to set off several bombs in Singapore was foiled by the local authorities.

In 2004, Abu Bakar Bashir created the Indonesian Mujahedeen Council to connect Islamist groups, including JI, in Indonesia.

Recruiting, training, indoctrination, financial, and operational links between the JI and other militant groups,  such as al-Qaeda, the Abu Sayyaf Group (ASG), the Misuari Renegade/Breakaway Group (MRG/MBG) and the Philippine Rajah Sulaiman movement (RSM) have existed for many years.

Bashir became the spiritual leader of the group while Hambali became the military leader. Unlike the Al-Mau'nah group, Jemaah Islamiah kept a low profile in Malaysia and their existence was publicized only after the 2002 Bali bombings.

Designation as a terrorist group
Jemaah Islamiyah has been designated a terrorist group by the following countries and international organizations:

State opponents

2002 Bali bombing
Prior to the first Bali bombing on 12 October 2002, there was underestimation to the threat Jemaah Islamiah posed. After this attack, the U.S. State Department designated Jemaah Islamiah as a Foreign Terrorist Organization.

Other terrorist attacks
In 2003, Indonesian police confirmed the existence of "Mantiqe-IV"  the JI regional cell which covered Irian Jaya and Australia. Indonesian police said Muklas has identified Mantiqe IV's leader as Abdul Rahim—an Indonesian-born Australian. Jemaah Islamiah is also strongly suspected of carrying out the 2003 JW Marriott hotel bombing in Kuningan, Jakarta, the 2004 Australian embassy bombing in Jakarta, the 2005 Bali terrorist bombing and the 2009 JW Marriott and Ritz-Carlton hotel bombings. The Bali and JW Marriott attacks showed that JI did not rule out attacking the same target more than once. The JI also has been directly and indirectly involved in dozens of bombings in the southern Philippines, usually in league with the ASG.

However, most of Jemaah Islamiyah prominent figures such as Hambali, Abu Dujana, Azahari Husin, Noordin Top and Dulmatin have either been captured or killed, mostly by Indonesian anti-terrorist squad, Detachment 88. While several of its former leaders, including Malaysian Islamic extremist and Afghanistan War veteran Nasir Abbas, have renounced violence and even assisted the Indonesian and Malaysian governments in the war on terrorism. Nasir Abbas was Noordin Top's former trainer.

Indonesian investigators revealed the JI's establishment of a hit squad in April 2007, which was established to target top leaders who oppose the group's objectives, as well as other officials, including police officers, government prosecutors and judges handling terrorism-related cases.

In April 2008, the South Jakarta District Court declared JI an illegal organisation when sentencing former leader Zarkasih and military commander Abu Dujana to 15 years on terrorism charges.

In 2010, Indonesian authorities cracked down on the Jemaah Islamiah network in Aceh. Between February and May 2010, more than 60 militants were captured. This Aceh network was established by Dulmatin sometime after 2007 when he returned to Indonesia.

Naming
The name Jemaah Islamiyah roughly translates to "Islamic Community" in English and is abbreviated as "JI". To counter the recruitment efforts by the group, Islamic scholars in Indonesia and the Philippines who are critical of the group suggested it be called Jemaah Munafiq (JM) instead, translated as "Hypocrites' Community".

Timeline

 12 March 2000, 3 JI members were arrested in Manila carrying plastic explosives in their luggage. One of them is later jailed for 17 years.
 1 August 2000, Jemaah Islamiyah attempted to assassinate the Philippine ambassador to Indonesia, Leonides Caday. The bomb detonated as his car entered his official residence in central Jakarta killing two people and injuring 21 others, including the ambassador.
 13 September 2000, a car bomb explosion tore through a packed parking deck beneath the Jakarta Stock Exchange building killing 15 people and injuring 20.
 24 December 2000, JI took part in a major coordinated terror strike, the Christmas Eve 2000 bombings.
 30 December 2000, a series of bombings that occurred around Metro Manila in the Philippines, 22 died and over a hundred were injured. In the following years, several members of the Jemaah Islamiyah for their suspected involvement in the bombings.
 5 June 2002, Indonesian authorities arrest Kuwaiti Omar al-Faruq. Handed over to the US authorities, he subsequently confesses he is a senior al-Qaeda operative sent to Southeast Asia to orchestrate attacks against U.S. interests. He reveals to investigators detailed plans of a new terror spree in Southeast Asia.
 After many warnings by U.S. authorities of a credible terrorist threat in Jakarta, on 23 September 2002, a grenade explodes in a car near the residence of a U.S. embassy official in Jakarta, killing one of the attackers.
 26 September 2002, the US State Department issued a travel warning urging Americans and other Westerners in Indonesia to avoid locations such as bars, restaurants and tourist areas.
 2 October 2002, a US Soldier and two Filipinos are killed in a JI nail-bomb attack outside a bar in the southern Philippine city of Zamboanga.
 10 October 2002, a bomb rips through a bus terminal in the southern Philippine city of Kidapawan, killing six people and injuring twenty-four. On the same day The U.S. ambassador in Jakarta, Ralph Boyce, personally delivers to the Indonesian President a message of growing concern that Americans could become targets of terrorist actions in her country.
 12 October 2002, on the second anniversary of the USS Cole bombing in Yemen, a huge car bomb kills more than 202 and injures 300 on the Indonesian resort island of Bali. Most are foreigners, mainly Australian tourists. It is preceded by a blast at the US consulate in nearby Denpasar. The attack known as the 2002 Bali bombings is the most deadly attack executed by JI to date.
 Bashir was arrested by the Indonesian police and was given a light sentence for treason.
 Hambali was arrested in Thailand on 11 August 2003, and is currently detained and awaiting trial by Military Commissions, in Guantanamo Bay, Cuba.
 A bomb manual published by the Jemaah Islamiyah was used in the 2002 Bali terrorist bombing, the 2003 JW Marriott hotel bombing, the Philippine consulate bombing in Jakarta, the Jakarta Stock Exchange bombing and the Christmas Eve bombings.
 A British-born Australian named Jack Roche confessed to being part of a JI plot to blow up the Israeli embassy in Canberra, Australia on 28 May 2004. He was sentenced to 9 years in prison on 31 May. The man admitted to meeting figures like Osama bin Laden in Afghanistan.
 JI are widely suspected of being responsible for the bombing outside the Australian embassy in Jakarta on 9 September 2004, which killed 11 Indonesians and wounded over 100 more.
 They are also suspected of committing 1 October, 2005 Bali bombings.
 9 November 2005, bomb-making expert and influential figure in Indonesian terrorist organization, Azahari Husin was killed in a raid at Batu, East Java.
 5 August 2006, Al-Qaeda's Al Zawahiri appeared on a recorded video announcing that JI and Al-Qaeda had joined forces and that the two groups will form "one line, facing its enemies".
 13 June 2007, Abu Dujana, the head of JI's military operations, is captured by Indonesian police.
 15 June 2007, Indonesian police announced the capture of Zarkasih, who was leading Jemaah Islamiyah since the capture of Hambali. Zarkasih is believed to be the emir of JI.
 27 February 2008, the leader of JI in Singapore, Mas Selamat bin Kastari, escaped from the Whitley Road Detention Centre.
 1 April 2009, Mas Selamat bin Kastari was recaptured in a raid by Pasukan Gerakan Khas and Special Branch in Johor, Malaysia.
 17 July 2009, Jemaah Islamiyah blamed for attacks on the Ritz Carlton Jakarta and the J.W. Marriott hotels in Jakarta.
 17 September 2009, Noordin Top was killed in a raid by Indonesian police in Solo, Central Java. Top was a recruiter, bomb maker, and explosions expert for Jemaah Islamiyah. However, later on his colleagues in Jemaah Islamiyah claimed that Noordin had formed his own splinter cell which was even more violent and militant. He was for a while dubbed the "most wanted Islamic militant in South East Asia".
 9 March 2010, Dulmatin was killed in a raid by Detasemen khusus 88 in Pamulang, South Tangerang
 13 December 2010, Indonesian police charged Abu Bakar Bashir, spiritual head of Jemaah Islamiyah, with involvement in plans of terror and military training in Aceh province. The charge against him of inciting others to commit terrorism carries the death penalty.
 January 2012, the Philippine military announced that it had killed two key leaders of Jemaah Islamiyah, a Malaysian called Zulkifli bin Hir (aka Marwan) and Mohammad Ali (aka Muawiyah). Senior intelligence sources later stated that Hir and Ali survived the air strike. Reports of Bin Hir's death were again retracted in 2014.
14 December 2012, the Philippine police tries to kill a suspected Malaysian terrorist after he was trying to detonate a bomb in Davao City, Philippines, and including one of a wife from Bicol Region after being arrested by the police.
26 February 2014, Sheikh Kahar Mundos, a bomb maker, left a bomb in a motorcycle hidden at the city hall in Cagayan de Oro, Philippines.
27 June 2014, Abdul Basit Usman, a bomb maker who was falsely reported killed in a US airstrike in Pakistan in 2010, is revealed to be alive and a potential terror threat.
16 September 2014, Jemaah Islamiyah claimed responsibility for the bombing of the Rizal Monument in front of the city hall of General Santos, Philippines, killing one person and injuring 7.
25 January 2015, JI member Zulkifli Abdhir was killed in the Philippines, an operation that also resulted in the death of 44 police officers.
1 July 2019, Indonesian police arrested Para Wijayanto, who was said to have been the leader of Jemaah Islamiyah since 2007.
2 July 2019, after the arrest of leader Para Wijayanto, Densus 88 counterterrorism unit of Indonesia traced palm oil plantations as a source of funding for the group, according to National Police spokesperson Brig. Gen. Dedi Prasetyo.
23 November 2020, Indonesian Police arrested Upik Lawanga, who has been involved in the 2002 Bali bombings. His role involves constructing bombs to be used in several terror attacks.
10 December 2020, Indonesian Police arrested Zulkarnaen, a high-ranking Jemaah Islamiyah official and leader. He is said to have been the mastermind of several terror attacks, including the 2002 Bali bombings, 2000 Christmas bombings, and 2003 JW Marriott bombing.

See also

 2003 Marriott Hotel bombing
 2004 Jakarta embassy bombing
 2005 Bali bombings
 2005 Indonesian beheading of Christian girls
 Azahari Husin
 Islamist terrorism
 List of designated terrorist groups
 Zulkifli Abdhir
 Jamaah Ansharut Tauhid
 Jamaah Ansharut Daulah

Notes and references

Notes

References

Further reading
 Abuza, Zachary. Militant Islam in Southeast Asia: Crucible of Terror.  Boulder, Colorado, USA: Lynne Rienner Publishers, 2003. .
 Atran, Scott (2010). Talking to the Enemy: Faith, Brotherhood, and the (Un)Making of Terrorists. New York: Ecco Press / HarperCollins. .
 Barton, Greg (2005). Jemaah Islamiyah: radical Islam in Indonesia. Singapore: Singapore University Press. .
 Lim, Merlyna. Islamic Radicalism and Anti-Americanism in Indonesia: The Role of the Internet. Washington: East-West Center, 2005. .
 Reeve, Simon. The New Jackals: Ramzi Yousef, Osama Bin Laden and the Future of Terrorism. Boston: Northeastern University Press, 1999.  .
 Ressa, Maria. Seeds of Terror: An Eyewitness Account of Al-Qaeda's Newest Center of Operations in Southeast Asia. New York: Free Press, 2003. .

External links
 Jemaah Islamiah in South East Asia: Damaged but Still Dangerous – International Crisis Group report dated 26 August 2003
 Jemaah Islamiyah’s Publishing Industry – International Crisis Group report dated 28 February 2008
 Constructing" the Jemaah Islamiyah Terrorist: A Preliminary Inquiry (PDF) – Institute of Defence and Strategic Studies, Singapore, report dated October 2004
 Funding Terrorism in Southeast Asia: The Financial Network of Al Qaeda and Jemaah Islamiyah (PDF) – National Bureau of Asian Research report dated December 2003
 cfrterrorism.org page on Jemaah Islamiah
"Jemaah Islamiah still a threat" – BBC News article dated 15 August 2003
 Jemaah Islamiyah Shown to Have Significant Ties to al Qaeda
  
 Combating JI in Indonesia
 Terrorism Perpetrated and Terrorists Apprehended
 Council on Foreign Relations Backgrounder: Jemaah Islamiyah
 

 
Rebel groups in Thailand
Rebel groups in the Philippines
Rebel groups in Indonesia
Islam-related controversies
Islamic terrorism in Indonesia
Islamic terrorism in Malaysia
Islamic terrorism in Singapore
Islamic terrorism in Thailand
Islamic terrorism in the Philippines
Islamist groups
Jihadist groups
Islamic organizations established in 1993
Moro people
Organizations established in 1993
Organisations designated as terrorist by the United Kingdom
Organizations designated as terrorist by the United States
Organizations based in Asia designated as terrorist
Groups affiliated with al-Qaeda
Organisations designated as terrorist by Japan
Organizations designated as terrorist by Canada